The Juba Game Reserve is a protected area in South Sudan, Africa. It is a game reserve and Important Bird Area. The  savannah grassland and woodland habitat features key species of Heuglin's spurfowl and Arabian bustard.

References

Game reserves of South Sudan
Important Bird Areas of South Sudan